X50 or X-50 may refer to:

Electronics
 Canon EOS Kiss X50, a digital single-lens reflex camera
 Dell Axim X50, a personal digital assistant
 Korg X50, a music workstation synthesizer
 Minolta DiMAGE X50, a digital viewfinder camera
 Realme X50 Pro, a smartphone
 Vivo X50, a line of Android-based smartphones

Vehicles

Aircraft
 Boeing X-50 Dragonfly, an unmanned aerial vehicle

Automobiles
 Lifan X50, a 2014–present Chinese subcompact SUV
 Proton X50, a 2020–present Malaysian compact SUV
 Toyota Cresta (X50), a 1980–1984 Japanese mid-size sedan

See also
 X5 (disambiguation)